The 2017 Poznań Open is a professional tennis tournament played on clay courts. It is the fourteenth edition of the tournament which is part of the 2017 ATP Challenger Tour. It takes place at the Park Tenisowy Olimpia in Poznań, Poland from 15 to 23 July 2017, including the qualifying competition in the first two days.

Singles main-draw entrants

Seeds

 1 Rankings are as of 3 July 2017.

Other entrants
The following players received wildcards into the singles main draw:
  Victor Vlad Cornea
  Michał Dembek
  Hubert Hurkacz
  Andriej Kapaś

The following players received entry from the qualifying draw:
  Danylo Kalenichenko
  Mariano Kestelboim
  Jonathan Mridha
  Maciej Rajski

Champions

Singles

  Alexey Vatutin def.  Guido Andreozzi 2–6, 7–6(12–10), 6–3.

Doubles

   Guido Andreozzi /  Jaume Munar def.  Tomasz Bednarek /  Gonçalo Oliveira  6–7(4–7), 6–3, [10–4].

External links
Official Website

2017 ATP Challenger Tour
2017
2017 in Polish tennis